La Nouvelle-Beauce (New Beauce) is a regional county municipality in the Chaudière-Appalaches region in southeastern Quebec, Canada, south of the Saint Lawrence River. It is located south of Lévis, along the Chaudière River.

Established in 1982 as a successor to Dorchester County, La Nouvelle-Beauce is made of 11 municipalities and is mainly French-speaking (99.2% French-speaking in 2006) and rural. Sainte-Marie, the county seat, is the most populous municipality.

The name of La Nouvelle-Beauce reminds the one given to the area along the Chaudière River by the French authorities until the end of the French Regime in North America.

Subdivisions
There are 11 subdivisions within the RCM:

Cities & Towns (1)
 Sainte-Marie

Municipalities (7)
 Frampton
 Saint-Bernard
 Saint-Elzéar
 Saint-Isidore
 Saint-Lambert-de-Lauzon
 Saints-Anges
 Scott
 Vallée-Jonction

Parishes (3)
 Sainte-Hénédine
 Sainte-Marguerite

Transportation

Access Routes
Highways and numbered routes that run through the municipality, including external routes that start or finish at the county border:

 Autoroutes
 

 Principal Highways
 
 
 

 Secondary Highways
 
 
 

 External Routes
 None

See also
 List of regional county municipalities and equivalent territories in Quebec
 Beauce, Quebec

References

External links
  La Nouvelle-Beauce Regional County Municipality

 
Regional county municipalities in Chaudière-Appalaches
Census divisions of Quebec
Sainte-Marie, Quebec